Compsocerops is an extinct genus of temnospondyl amphibians recovered from the Late Triassic Upper Maleri Formation of India, and the Santa Maria Formation of Brazil.

References 

Chigutisaurids
Prehistoric amphibian genera
Carnian genera
Norian genera
Triassic temnospondyls of Asia
Triassic India
Fossils of India
Triassic temnospondyls of South America
Triassic Brazil
Fossils of Brazil
Fossil taxa described in 1995